Rafael Domingo may refer to:

Rafael Santo Domingo, retired Major League Baseball pinch hitter
Rafael Domingo Osle, Spanish jurist